Armenia participated at the 2018 Summer Youth Olympics in Buenos Aires, Argentina from 6 October to 18 October 2018.

Medalists
Medals awarded to participants of mixed-NOC teams are represented in italics. These medals are not counted towards the individual NOC medal tally.

|width="30%" align=left valign=top|

Gymnastics

Rhythmic gymnastics
Armenia qualified one rhythmic gymnast based on its performance at the European qualification event.

 Girls' rhythmic individual all-around - 1 quota

Judo

Individual

Team

Shooting

Armenia qualified one sport shooter based on its performance at the 2018 European Championships. 

 Boys' 10m Air Rifle - 1 quota

Team

Swimming

Boys

Taekwondo

Weightlifting

Armenia qualified one athlete based on its performance at the 2017 World Youth Championships.

Boy

Girl

Wrestling

Key:
  – Without any point scored by the opponent
  – With point(s) scored by the opponent

References

2018 in Armenian sport
Nations at the 2018 Summer Youth Olympics
Armenia at the Youth Olympics